In enzymology, an indolylacetyl-myo-inositol galactosyltransferase is an enzyme that catalyzes the chemical reaction

UDP-galactose + (indol-3-yl)acetyl-myo-inositol  UDP + 5-O-(indol-3-yl)acetyl-myo-inositol D-galactoside

Thus, the two substrates of this enzyme are UDP-galactose and indol-3-ylacetyl-myo-inositol, whereas its two products are UDP and 5-O-(indol-3-yl)acetyl-myo-inositol D-galactoside.

This enzyme belongs to the family of glycosyltransferases, specifically the hexosyltransferases.  The systematic name of this enzyme class is UDP-galactose:(indol-3-yl)acetyl-myo-inositol 5-O-D-galactosyltransferase. Other names in common use include uridine diphosphogalactose-indolylacetylinositol, galactosyltransferase, indol-3-ylacetyl-myo-inositol galactoside synthase, UDP-galactose:indol-3-ylacetyl-myo-inositol, and 5-O-D-galactosyltransferase.

References

 

EC 2.4.1
Enzymes of unknown structure